December Bride is an American sitcom that aired on the CBS television network from 1954 to 1959. It was adapted from the original CBS radio network series of the same name that aired from June 1952 through September 1953.

Overview
December Bride centered on the adventures of Lily Ruskin, a spry widow played by Spring Byington. Ruskin was not, in fact, a "December" bride (married late in life) but she very much desired to become one, if the right man were to come along. Aiding Lily in her search for this prospective suitor were her daughter, Ruth Henshaw (Frances Rafferty), her son-in-law, Matt Henshaw (Dean Miller), and her close friend Hilda Crocker (character actress Verna Felton). A next-door neighbor, insurance agent Pete Porter (Harry Morgan), frequently appeared. Married miserably, according to his constant complaints about his unseen wife, Gladys, Pete despised his own mother-in-law and envied Matt's happy relationship with Lily. The pilot episode premiered on October 4, 1954, and involved Lily moving in with her daughter and son-in-law. Most of the series was set in the Henshaws' living room.

First-run episodes of December Bride aired on television for 5 seasons (1954–1959), sponsored by General Foods' Instant Maxwell House Coffee. During the first four seasons, the program was  supplanted in the summer months by "summer replacement" series (such as Ethel and Albert), but in its final year, reruns were shown in the same time slot during the summer hiatus.

Thanks in part to following I Love Lucy, December Bride had high ratings its first four seasons – #10 in 1954–1955, #6 in 1955–1956, #5 in 1956–1957 and #9 in 1957–1958. When CBS moved it to Thursdays in the fall of 1958, ratings fell dramatically, and the series was cancelled in 1959.

In 1960, a new series titled Pete and Gladys debuted, set around many of the same characters. This spinoff series focuses on Pete Porter and his wife, now visible and played by comedian Cara Williams. The December Bride character Hilda Crocker, played by Verna Felton, appears in 23 episodes of Pete and Gladys, which aired until 1962.

After production had ceased, CBS used repeat episodes of December Bride to fill slots in its prime-time programming. In July 1960, December Bride repeats filled the second half of the Friday 9 pm Eastern time slot vacated by Westinghouse Desilu Playhouse, running until the beginning of the fall schedule in 1960. The program served as a temporary replacement on Thursday nights in April 1961. December Bride repeats were shown on CBS as a daytime program from October 1959 until March 1961. The daytime reruns and an attempt to syndicate the show were ratings failures. His experience with December Bride encouraged CBS executive  Michael Dann's use of "hammocking", framing a weak or new series between two established shows to improve its viewership.

Cast
Spring Byington as Lily Ruskin
Frances Rafferty as Ruth Henshaw
Dean Miller as Matt Henshaw
Verna Felton as Hilda Crocker
Harry Morgan as Pete Porter

Guest stars

 Desi Arnaz as himself
 Edgar Bergen as himself
 Madge Blake as Anita Henderson in "Family Quarrel" (1955) and as Margaret in "The Homecoming Show" (1957)
 Rory Calhoun as himself in "Rory Calhoun, the Texan'
 Harry Cheshire as Gus in "Lily Ruskin Arrives" (1954) and as Poole in "Big Game Hunter" (1955)
 Zsa Zsa Gabor as herself
 Fred MacMurray as himself
 Marjorie Main as herself
 Lyle Talbot, six episodes in different roles

Ownership
Parke Levy, who created and wrote December Bride, owned 50% of the program, and Desilu and CBS owned 25% each.

Episodes

Crew
DaLonne Cooper was the script supervisor.

Notes

References
 Brooks, Tim and Marsh, Earle, The Complete Directory to Prime Time Network and Cable TV Shows
 Dunning, John, On the Air: The Encyclopedia Of Old-Time Radio

External links

 

CBS original programming
1954 American television series debuts
1959 American television series endings
1950s American sitcoms
Television shows set in Los Angeles
Television series by CBS Studios
Black-and-white American television shows
English-language television shows
Television series by Desilu Productions
Television series based on radio series
Television series about widowhood